The Bandar Baru Klang LRT station is a light rapid transit (LRT) station that serves the suburb of Klang in Selangor, Malaysia. It serves as one of the stations on the Shah Alam line. The station is an elevated rapid transit station in Bandar Baru Klang, Klang, Selangor, Malaysia, forming part of the Klang Valley Integrated Transit System.

The station is marked as Station No. 17 along the RM9 billion line project with the line's maintenance depot located in Johan Setia, Klang. The Bandar Bukit Raja LRT station is expected to be operational in February 2024 and will have facilities such as public parking, kiosks, restrooms, elevators, taxi stand and feeder bus among others.

Surrounding Areas
 Bandar Baru Klang business park
 KPJ Klang Specialist Hospital
 Acmar International School
 AEON Bukit Raja Shopping Centre
 Wynham Acmar Hotel
 Hotel BBK
 Country Hotel
 SMJK Kwang Hua Klang
 BBK Condominium
 Klang Executive Club
 Wisma Persekutuan Daerah Klang
 Taman Berkeley
 Palm Garden Apartment
 Pangsapuri Mawar
 Pangsapuri Dahlia

References

External links
 LRT3 Bandar Utama–Klang line

Rapid transit stations in Selangor
Shah Alam Line